The 1868 United States presidential election in Maryland took place on November 3, 1868, as part of the 1868 United States presidential election. Voters chose seven representatives, or electors to the Electoral College, who voted for president and vice president.

Maryland voted for the Democratic nominee, Horatio Seymour over the Republican nominee, Ulysses S. Grant. Seymour won the state by a margin of 34.4%.

With 67.2% of the popular vote, Maryland would be Seymour's third strongest victory in terms of percentage in the popular vote after Kentucky and Louisiana. To date this is the best performance by a Democrat in Maryland history.

This was the first Presidential election that Wicomico County was able to vote in.

Results

Results by county

See also
 United States presidential elections in Maryland
 1868 United States presidential election
 1868 United States elections

Notes

References 

Maryland
1868
Presidential